What's It Gonna Take? is the 43rd studio album by Northern Irish singer-songwriter Van Morrison, released on 20 May 2022. It reached the Top Ten in Germany, Austria and Switzerland, but was his second successive album not to chart in Ireland. It was his first solo album in over fifty years not to chart in the US.

Critical reception
While the musicianship and sound of the album was generally well-received  by critics, the lyrical subject matter of COVID-19 denialism was widely criticised. In The Arts Desk, Nick Hasted scored it two out of five stars, accused the artist of "monomania", and called the album "egocentric, pernicious, and already outdated". However, he noted that select tracks were of a high quality. AllMusic Guide awarded it two and a half out of five stars, with Stephen Thomas Erlewine finding Morrison "doubling down on all of his gripes", and concluding that the resultant "blend of anodyne R&B and anger makes for one of the odder albums" in his catalogue. In his Pop Medicine column on MedPage Today, Dr. Arthur Lazarus praised the "first-rate" music, but ultimately dismissed the album as a "self-absorbed descent into COVID lunacy". He condemned Morrison for ignoring scientific facts, seeing the pandemic in an egocentric manner, and speaking out against the media while benefiting from its attentions. 

In an article bearing the headline, "Van Morrison’s Songs of the Free", National Review said that the "cultural and philosophical breakthrough album asks the question of the age." It finds that, "[singing] from a place of innate liberty", Morrison is "in a vigorous, inventive frame of mind", and concludes that he "describes the culture’s recent repression".

Track listing
All songs written by Van Morrison
"Dangerous" – 7:40
"What’s It Gonna Take?" – 3:23
"Fighting Back Is the New Normal" – 3:36
"Fodder for the Masses" – 4:45
"Can’t Go On This Way" – 6:42
"Sometimes It’s Just Blah Blah Blah" – 3:37
"Money from America" – 7:36
"Not Seeking Approval" – 6:31
"Damage and Recovery" – 4:05
"Nervous Breakdown" – 5:09
"Absolutely Positively the Most" – 5:20
"I Ain’t No Celebrity" – 4:41
"Stage Name" – 4:28
"Fear and Self‐Loathing in Las Vegas" – 5:04
"Pretending" – 6:47

Personnel

"Dangerous"
Bass guitar – Pete Hurley
Drums, Backing Vocals – Colin Griffin
Hammond organ, Backing Vocals – Richard Dunn
Fiddle, Backing Vocals – Seth Lakeman
Lead Electric Guitar, Backing Vocals – Dave Keary
Percussion – Sticky Wicket
Piano – Stuart McIlroy
Vocals, Electric Guitar – Van Morrison
"What's It Gonna Take?"
Backing Vocals – Crawford Bell
Bass guitar – Pete Hurley
Drums, Percussion, Backing Vocals – Colin Griffin
Hammond Organ, Backing Vocals – Richard Dunn
Percussion – Sticky Wicket
Piano – Stuart McIlroy
Saxophone – Paul O'Reilly
Trumpet – Mike Barkley
Vocals, Electric Guitar – Van Morrison
"Fighting Back Is the New Normal"
Backing Vocals – Crawford Bell, Jolene O'Hara
Bass guitar – Pete Hurley
Drums, Backing Vocals – Colin Griffin
Hammond Organ, Backing Vocals – Richard Dunn
Piano – Stuart McIlroy
Vocals, Electric Guitar – Van Morrison
"Fodder from the Masses"
Backing Vocals – Crawford Bell, Dana Masters, Jolene O'Hara
Bass guitar – Pete Hurley
Drums – Colin Griffin
Hammond Organ – Richard Dunn
Piano – Stuart McIlroy
Vocals, Electric Guitar – Van Morrison
"Can't Go On This Way"
Acoustic Guitar – Dave Keary
Bass guitar – Pete Hurley
Drums – Colin Griffin
Hammond Organ, Rhodes piano – Richard Dunn
Percussion – Sticky Wicket
Saxophone – Paul O'Reilly
Trumpet – Mike Barkley
Vocals, Electric Guitar – Van Morrison
"Sometimes It's Just Blah Blah Blah"
Bass guitar – Pete Hurley
Bongos, Congas – Teena Lyle
Drums, Percussion, Backing Vocals – Colin Griffin
Hammond Organ, Backing Vocals – Richard Dunn
Lead Electric Guitar, Mandolin, Backing Vocals – Dave Keary
Percussion – Sticky Wicket
Piano – Stuart McIlroy
Vocals, Saxophone, Electric Guitar – Van Morrison
"Money from America"
Bass guitar – Pete Hurley
Drums, Percussion, Backing Vocals – Colin Griffin
Hammond Organ, Backing Vocals – Richard Dunn
Lead Electric Guitar, Backing Vocals – Dave Keary
Percussion – Sticky Wicket
Vocals, Electric Guitar – Van Morrison
"Not Seeking Approval"
Backing Vocals – Crawford Bell, Dana Masters
Bass guitar – Pete Hurley
Drums, Percussion – Colin Griffin
Hammond Organ – Richard Dunn
Piano – Stuart McIlroy
Vocals – Van Morrison
"Damage and Recovery"
Backing Vocals – Crawford Bell, Dana Masters, Kelly Smiley
Bass guitar – Nick Scott
Drums – Eamon Ferris
Piano – John McCullough
Vocals, Saxophone – Van Morrison
"Nervous Breakdown"
Backing Vocals – Crawford Bell, Jolene O'Hara, Kelly Smiley
Bass guitar – Pete Hurley
Drums – Colin Griffin
Hammond Organ – Richard Dunn
Percussion – Sticky Wicket
Piano – Stuart McIlroy
Saxophone – Paul O'Reilly
Trumpet – Mike Barkley
Vocals, Electric Guitar – Van Morrison
"Absolutely Positively the Most"
Backing Vocals – Crawford Bell, Dana Masters, Kelly Smiley
Bass guitar – Pete Hurley
Drums, Percussion – Colin Griffin
Hammond Organ – Richard Dunn
Piano – Stuart McIlroy
Vocals, Electric Guitar – Van Morrison
"I Ain't No Celebrity"
Backing Vocals – Crawford Bell, Dana Masters, Jolene O'Hara
Bass guitar – Pete Hurley
Drums – Colin Griffin
Hammond Organ – Richard Dunn
Piano – Stuart McIlroy
Vocals, Electric Guitar – Van Morrison
"Stage Name"
Backing Vocals – Crawford Bell, Dana Masters
Bass guitar – Pete Hurley
Drums – Colin Griffin
Hammond Organ – Richard Dunn
Piano – John McCullough
Vocals, Electric Guitar – Van Morrison
"Fear and Self-Loathing in Las Vegas"
Bass guitar – Pete Hurley
Drums – Colin Griffin
Hammond Organ – Richard Dunn
Piano – Stuart McIlroy
Vocals, Saxophone – Van Morrison
"Pretending"
Backing Vocals – Crawford Bell, Jolene O'Hara
Bass guitar – Pete Hurley
Drums, Percussion – Colin Griffin
Hammond Organ – Richard Dunn
Percussion – Sticky Wicket
Piano – John McCullough
Saxophone – Paul O'Reilly
Trumpet – Mike Barkley
Vocals, Electric Guitar – Van Morrison
Technical personnel
Design – Paperjam Design
Engineer [Assistant Engineer] – Katie May (tracks: A1, B5 to B7), Oli Jacobs (tracks: A1, B5 to B7), Oli Middleton (tracks: A1, B5 to B7)
Illustration – Dameon Priestly
Mastered By – Tony Cousins at Metropolis Mastering
Mixed By – Ben McAuley at Rosetta Studio, Belfast
Produced By – Van Morrison
Recorded By – Ben McAuley

Chart performance

See also
List of 2022 albums

References

External links
Announcement from Morrison's site

2022 albums
Van Morrison albums
Virgin Records albums